In computer vision and computer graphics, 4D reconstruction is the process of capturing the shape and appearance of real objects along a temporal dimension. This process can be accomplished by methods such as depth camera imaging, photometric stereo, or structure from motion, and is also referred to as spatio-temporal reconstruction.

See also
 3D reconstruction
 Free viewpoint television
 Structure from motion
 Volumetric video

References

External links

 c-Space: 4D Reconstruction from pictures and videos

Computer graphics
3D imaging